The Church of Our Lady of Good Counsel is a Roman Catholic parish church in the Roman Catholic Archdiocese of New York, located at 10 Austin Place, Staten Island, New York City.

History
The parish was established by the Augustinians on 30 May 1899 with the Rev. Nicholas J. Murphy, O.S.A. being the first pastor.

The first mass in Tompkinsville occurred 12 November 1899 in McRobert's Hall on Arietta Street. A large chapel in the building of the Augustinian Academy (Tompkinsville, Staten Island) "was used for parochial purposes with the chapel of Our Lady of Consolation in Tompkinsville.  The chapel, which is situated on St. Paul's Avenue, was erected on 2 February 1902."  It was enlarged and renovated in the summer of 1908 and the parish numbered around 400 in 1914.  The second pastor, the Irish-born Rev. B.E. Daly, O.S.A., was a missionary before being appointed to the Tompkinsville parish on 22 December 1910.

The modern church building was designed by the architectural firm of Genovese & Maddalene of 175 Rock Road, Glen Rock, New Jersey. The firm also designed Manhattan's Church of the Nativity in 1968. It was dedicated by Terrence Cardinal Cooke on April 26, 1968.

Pastors
1899-1910: Rev. Nicholas J. Murphy, O.S.A.
1910-:Rev. B.E. Daly, O.S.A.

References 

Religious organizations established in 1898
Roman Catholic churches in Staten Island
Roman Catholic churches completed in 1968
20th-century Roman Catholic church buildings in the United States